The following squads were named for the 1926 South American Championship that took place in Chile.

Argentina
 Octavio Díaz
 Ludovico Bidoglio
 Roberto Cochrane
 Ángel Médici
 Ramon Muttis
 Silvestre Conti
 Mario Fortunato
 Gabino Sosa
 Luis Vaccaro
 Roberto Cherro
 Antonio De Miguel
 Benjamín Delgado
 Feliciano Perducca
 Domingo Tarasconi

Bolivia
 Teófilo Aguilar
 Mario Alborta
 Eliseo Angulo
 Hernán Araníbar
 Jesús Bermúdez
 José Bustamante
 Casiano José Chavarría
 Diógenes Lara
 Rafael Méndez
 Renato Sáinz
 Carlos Soto
 Jorge Soto
 Alberto Urriolagoitía
 Jorge Luis Valderrama

Chile
 Roberto Cortés
 Carlos Hill
 Manuel Figueroa
 Víctor Morales
 Ulises Poirrier
 Francisco Sánchez
 Leoncio Veloso
 Oscar González
 Guillermo Saavedra
 Victor Toro
 David Arellano
 Carlos García
 Humberto Moreno
 Horacio Muñoz
 José Olguín
 Manuel Ramírez
 Guillermo Subiabre

Paraguay
 Bartolomé Brizuela
 Modesto Denis
 Diógenes Domínguez
 Francisco Duarte
 Manuel Fleitas Solich
 Luis Fretes
 Ildefonso López
 Gaspar Nessi
 Lino Nessi
 Ceferino Ramírez
 Pablo Ramírez
 Manuel Recalde
 Juan Rolón
 Axel Sirvent
 Luis Vargas Peña

Uruguay
 Fausto Batignani
 Andrés Mazali
 Abraham Lobos
 José Nasazzi
 Emilio Recoba
 Domingo Tejera
 José Andrade
 Pascual Cabrera
 Lorenzo Fernandez
 Alfredo Ghierra
 José Vanzzino
 René Borjas
 Hector Castro
 Nicolás Conti
 Ángel Romano
 Zoilo Saldombide
 Héctor Scarone
 Santos Urdinarán

References

Squads
Copa América squads